Weird War Tales was a war comic book title with supernatural overtones published by DC Comics. It was published from September–October 1971 to June 1983.

Publication history
The original title ran for 12 years and 124 issues. It was an anthology series that told war stories with horror, mystery, fantasy and science fiction elements. Changes in the Comics Code Authority made the use of horror elements possible. The first seven issues were reprinted material. Each issue beginning with issue #8 was hosted by Death, usually depicted as a skeleton dressed in a different military uniform each issue. The title's name was inspired by editor Joe Orlando.<ref>{{cite book|last= Daniels|first= Les|author-link= Les Daniels|title= DC Comics: Sixty Years of the World's Favorite Comic Book Heroes|publisher= Bulfinch Press|date= 1995|location= New York, New York|page= 153|isbn= 0821220764|quote= 'Carmine Infantino and I found out that the word weird sold well', [editor Joe] Orlando recalls. 'So DC created Weird War and Weird Western'.}}</ref> Walt Simonson's first professional published comic book work appeared in Weird War Tales #10 (January 1973). Roger McKenzie and Frank Miller's first collaboration was on a two-page story published in Weird War Tales #68 (October 1978). Recurring characters began to appear late in the series run, notably the G.I. Robot, and the return of "The War that Time Forgot" which originally ran in Star Spangled War Stories. Writer J. M. DeMatteis and penciler Pat Broderick created the Creature Commandos in Weird War Tales #93 (November 1980).

Several issues featured a series of short vignettes titled "The Day After Doomsday" featuring largely doomed characters dealing with various threats and harsh ironies of living in a post-nuclear war apocalyptic landscape. The first few stories dealt with a society reduced to medieval ways seven centuries after a war but most others dealt with the near-term aftermath, with the unexpected results of radiation or infrastructure damage almost always catching the characters by surprise.

Other stories featured robot soldiers, ghosts, the undead, and other paranormal characters from different eras of time.

RevivalWeird War Tales was revived for DC Comics' Vertigo imprint in 1997. It was published as a four-issue limited series, followed by two one-shot special issues in 2000 and 2010.

 Collected editions 
 Showcase Presents: Weird War Tales collects Weird War Tales #1–21, 576 pages, December 2012, 
 America at War includes Weird War Tales #3: "The Pool" by Len Wein, Marv Wolfman and Russ Heath, 247 pages, July 1979, 
 Showcase Presents: The Great Disaster featuring the Atomic Knights includes "The Day After Doomsday" stories from Weird War Tales #22-23, 30, 32, 40, 42–44, 46–49, 51–53, 64, 68, 69, and 123, 576 pages, June 2014, 
 The Steve Ditko Omnibus Volume 1 includes stories from Weird War Tales #46, 49, 95, 99, and 104–106, 480 pages, September 2011, 
 DC Through the 80s: The End of Eras includes Weird War Tales #93, 520 pages, December 2020, 
 The Creature Commandos collects Weird War Tales #93, 97, 100, 102, 105, 108–112, 114–119, 121, and 124, 288 pages, December 2013, 

See alsoWeird Western Tales'', a sister title dealing in Weird West stories.

References

External links

 Weird War Tales at Cover Browser
Weird War Tales and Weird War Tales (vol. 2) at Mike's Amazing World of Comics

1971 comics debuts
1983 comics endings
1997 comics debuts
1997 comics endings
Comic book limited series
Comics anthologies
Comics by Arnold Drake
Comics by Bob Haney
Comics by Carl Wessler
Comics by David Michelinie
Comics by Frank Miller (comics)
Comics by George Kashdan
Comics by Howard Chaykin
Comics by J. M. DeMatteis
Comics by Robert Kanigher
Comics by Steve Ditko
Comics by Steve Englehart
Comics by Steve Gerber
Comics magazines published in the United States
DC Comics one-shots
DC Comics set during World War II
DC Comics titles
Defunct American comics
Fantasy comics
Horror comics
Science fiction comics
War comics